Aseptatorina is a suborder of parasitic alveolates of the phylum Apicomplexia

Taxonomy

There are eleven families recognised in this suborder. There are ~400 species in these families.

Five families — Allantocystidae, Diplocystidae, Enterocystidae, Ganymedidae and Schaudinnellidae — have only one genus. Aikinetocystidae has two genera.

Two families in this suborder — Ganymedidae and Thiriotiidae — infect crustaceans.

The taxonomy of this suborder may be in need of revision as it has been shown based on SSU 18S rDNA sequences that four families — Ganymedidae from the Aseptatorina and  Cephalolobidae, Porosporidae and Uradiophoridae from the Septatorina appear to form a superfamily. The name Cephaloidophoroidea has been proposed for this superfamily

History

This suborder was created by Chakravarty in 1960.

Description

The gamont of the species in this suborder have a single compartment.  An epimerite or mucron is found in some species.

Syzygy occurs.

References

SAR supergroup suborders
Conoidasida